Gerard Lough is an Irish film director best known for Night People, Spears and the short film The Boogeyman, based on a story by Stephen King.

Career
After graduating from the North West Institute in Derry, he took an internship in a U.S. advertising agency where he directed his first professional music video. Since then he has directed a dozen music videos as well as several short films such as the Stephen King adaption The Boogeyman which received extensive press coverage. His first feature film as director was Night People, was released in cinemas in November 2015. It was met with mostly positive reviews but a limited audience due to a short theatrical run. His second feature, a mystery / thriller called Spears, was released in 2022.

Filmography
Feature Films
 2022: Spears
 2015: Night People

Short Films
 2012: Ninety Seconds
 2010: The Boogeyman
 2009: The Stolen Wings
 2009: The Scanner
 2008: Deviant
 2007: A Long Term Effect
 2007: Ulterior

Music Videos
 2019: Counterfeit, Le Groupe Fantastique
 2017: It Feels So Good, Michael O'Boyce
 2017: Warped, Electro Kill Machine
 2016: Exoself, Voynich
 2016: Rush of Blood, AustenEx
 2015: Night People, Voynich
 2008: Life In The Big City, Cian Furlong
 2007: Baby Boom Boom, Cian Furlong
 2006: I Lift My Hands, Lise and The Scarbrough Affair
 2006: Karma & Destiny, The Scarbrough Affair
 2005: The Divine Beat, Robbie Mc Donald
 2005: Demon, First On
 2003: Rachel Hates The Sun, Dan Anderson Band

References

External links
 
 Official Twitter

1978 births
Living people
Irish film directors
Irish music video directors